Glyndwr Cennydd Jones (born March 1969) is a chief executive officer, education professional, writer on constitutional matters, and former political candidate.

Glyndwr Cennydd Jones is presently Director of a UK-wide industry body for institutions delivering training, education and assessment in the arts, a position he has held since September 2012. He previously had a senior role at an international awarding organisation for over 11 years and was awarded Honorary Membership of Trinity College London in 2010 for outstanding services in the field of academic quality assurance and government accreditation globally. He is also the main author of the booklet Graded Exams: The Definitive Guide.

Glyndwr is a Fellow of the Institute of Welsh Affairs, a writer on constitutional matters and an advocate for a UK-wide constitutional convention. He released joint publications with Lord David Owen and Lord Elystan Morgan in 2017 and 2018 respectively, and a booklet of constitutional reflections in March 2022, which includes a preface by Carwyn Jones, the former First Minister of Wales for almost 10 years.

Glyndwr is the son of Gwynoro Jones, the former Labour and SDP politician, and stood twice for Plaid Cymru in the constituency of Merthyr Tydfil and Rhymney during the period of the party's Welsh Assembly coalition with Labour—specifically in the National Assembly for Wales Election 2007 and the Westminster General Election 2010—after which he has pursued his professional career. He is an advocate for greater cross-party collaboration.

Jones had argued for a looser confederation instead of the current United Kingdom.

References 

1969 births
Living people
Plaid Cymru